William de Kirkeby (died 1302) was an English prior. He was prior at Wallingford Priory in the late 13th century.

Life events 

The Bodleian Library holds a mutilated deed (c. 1280) showing some disputes between Kirkeby and Henry de Horsyndon, rector, and the parishioners of the parish of St. Mary the Greater in Wallingford. 

The Great Munden manor was received by Kirkeby when his brother John de Kirkeby, Bishop of Ely, died in 1290. Oldbury, a Stoke Mandeville manor, was owned by Kirkeby's wife (Christiana) during the reign of king Edward I.

Richard of Wallingford's father died when he just turned 10 years old (c. 1301-1302) and was soon thereafter adopted by Kirkeby and taken care.  Kirkeby sent Richard as a young man to Oxford University to get educated.

Kirkeby died in 1302.

References

Sources 

 
 
 
 
 

People from Wallingford, Oxfordshire
14th-century English clergy
13th-century English clergy
1302 deaths